Thomas Dacre, 2nd Baron Dacre of Gilsland, KG (25 November 1467 – 24 October 1525) was the son of Humphrey Dacre, 1st Baron Dacre of Gilsland and Mabel Parr, great-aunt of queen consort Catherine Parr, the sixth and final wife of King Henry VIII of England. His mother was the daughter of Sir Thomas Parr of Kendal by his wife, Alice Tunstall.

Early career
Thomas Dacre was born in Cumberland, the eldest of nine children. His father Humphrey died of natural causes on 30 May 1485, whereupon, Thomas succeeded him as Baron Dacre of Gilsland.

Dacre took part in the Battle of Bosworth (22 August 1485) on the Yorkist side against Henry Tudor, where the Yorkist king, Richard III of England, was defeated and killed. He however quickly made peace with the victor. This early support for the House of Tudor earned him some favour with Henry Tudor (who had now ascended the throne as "King Henry VII of England"), who would continue to trust his services for the remainder of his reign. King Henry VII named him a Knight of the Bath in 1503. Dacre later swore loyalty to King Henry's son and successor, Henry VIII of England, when he ascended the throne in 1509.

He was named deputy of the Lord Warden of the Marches (an officer on the border with Scotland) in 1485, and then Warden of the Western Marches, and finally Warden-general over all the marches in 1509. James IV of Scotland granted him fishing rights to salmon of the river Esk in April 1498, allowing him to build fish traps called "garths". He was to pay a duty of a number of fish to the keeper of Lochmaben Castle each year.

Dacre and his forces served under Thomas Howard, Earl of Surrey at the Battle of Flodden (9 September 1513), where the invading army of James IV was crushingly defeated and its king killed. Dacre had commanded the "Border Lancers" at the battle, and their charge had saved Lord Edmund Howard, commander of the English right wing.  King James IV himself had been killed, and the Kingdom of Scotland then ceased its involvement in the War of the League of Cambrai. The victory further helped solidify the reputation of Dacre as a soldier. After the battle, Dacre discovered the body of the Scottish king, informed Thomas Howard, Lord Admiral, and took it to Berwick upon Tweed. He later wrote that the Scots, "love me worst of any Inglisheman living, by reason that I fande the body of the King of Scotts."

Margaret Tudor, the widow of James IV, and sister of Henry VIII, wrote to Dacre. Around September 1515 they discussed her leaving Scotland, and Margaret wrote that Dacre was misinformed, and that she could not pass where ever she wished. In August 1516 he wrote to Cardinal Wolsey about his activity in Scotland to subvert the Duke of Albany, and raids in Scotland to burn crops and farms. He had sent John Whelpdale, the Master of the College of Greystoke to collect Margaret's rents and her jewels.

Dacre organised repairs at Wark Castle in 1517 obtaining money from Cardinal Wolsey and employing the Master Mason of Berwick to design new fortifications. In June 1518 he wrote that the new donjon or keep was finished, and fit to mount great cannon on each vaulted floor. There were three wards or courtyards, almost complete. 

King Henry VIII named him a Knight of the Garter in 1518, alongside William Sandys, 1st Baron Sandys of the Vyne. He was present, with all the other Garter Knights, at the meeting in 1520 between Henry VIII and Francis I of France now known as the Field of the Cloth of Gold.

Dacre died on the borders on 24 October 1525, killed by a fall from his horse, and was buried in his family's mausoleum at Lanercost Priory. By the time of his death, he held about 70,000 acres (280 km²) of land in Cumberland, 30,000 acres (120 km²) in Yorkshire, and 20,000 acres (80 km²) in Northumberland. Much of these lands had been inherited through marriages with the heiresses of the Greystoke, de Multon, and de Vaux families, as well as grants given by both Kings, Henry VII and Henry VIII.

Known as "the Builder Dacre", Thomas Dacre built the gateway of Naworth Castle (the seat of the Dacre family), and placed over it his coat of arms with the Dacre family motto below: Fort en Loialte (Norman-French: "Strong in Loyalty").

Marriage
Circa 1488, Dacre eloped with Elizabeth Greystoke, 6th Baroness Greystoke suo jure (10 July 1471 – 14 August 1516), daughter of Sir Robert de Greystoke and Lady Elizabeth Grey, daughter of Edmund Grey, 1st Earl of Kent and Lady Katherine Percy. Dacre took her at night from Brougham Castle in Westmorland where, as a ward of the King, she was in the custody of Henry Clifford, 10th Baron de Clifford.

Elizabeth was the eldest granddaughter and heiress of Ralph de Greystoke, 5th Baron Greystoke. She had only recently succeeded her grandfather in the barony, when by their marriage, Dacre became the jure uxoris Baron Greystoke. The extensive lands held by the Greystokes passed to the Dacre family through this marriage. These included Greystoke Castle and the barony of Greystoke, Morpeth Castle and the barony of Morpeth, along with the lost manor of Henderskelf, which is now the site of Castle Howard.

Thomas and Elizabeth had eight children:

Mabel Dacre (c. 1490–1533), married Henry Scrope, 7th Baron Scrope of Bolton. They were parents of John Scrope, 8th Baron Scrope of Bolton and grandparents of Henry Scrope, 9th Baron Scrope of Bolton. The 9th Baron is better known because he was governor of Carlisle in the time of Queen Elizabeth I of England, and as such, took charge of Mary, Queen of Scots, when she crossed the border in 1568. He took her to Bolton Castle, where she remained there till January 1569.
Elizabeth Dacre (1495-1538), married Sir Thomas Musgrave, Marshall of Berwick. Their son was William Musgrave, MP.
William Dacre, 3rd Baron Dacre (29 April 1500 – 18 November 1563), married Lady Elizabeth Talbot, a daughter of George Talbot, 4th Earl of Shrewsbury and Anne Hastings, by whom he had issue.
Anne Dacre (c. 1501 – 21 April 1548), married Christopher Conyers, 2nd Baron Conyers. They were the parents of John Conyers, 3rd Baron Conyers.
Mary Dacre (c.1502 – 29 March 1538), married her sister-in-law's brother, Francis Talbot, 5th Earl of Shrewsbury. They were the parents of George Talbot, 6th Earl of Shrewsbury.
Hon. Humphrey Dacre, married Isabel Martindale, daughter and co-heiress of James Martindale of Newton, Allerdale, Cumberland.
Jane Dacre, wife of Lord Tailboys.

Legacy
His illegitimate son Thomas Dacre, nicknamed "the Bastard", successfully led a few hundred English bordermen against part of the invading force of James V of Scotland on 12 November 1542. His success paved the way for the Scottish defeat at Battle of Solway Moss (24 November 1542). This Thomas was rewarded with land grants and from him starts a secondary line of "Dacres of Lanercost". 

Letters between him and Lady Maud Parr for the marriage of his grandson, Henry le Scrope (son of Henry Scrope, 7th Baron Scrope of Bolton), to her daughter, Catherine Parr survive. The marriage never happened, but Catherine would go on to become queen consort to King Henry VIII.

Ancestry

See also
Naworth Castle, ancestral home of the Dacre family

References

1467 births
1525 deaths
People from Cumberland
Knights of the Garter
15th-century English people
16th-century English nobility
Thomas Dacre, 2nd Baron Dacre
Lords Warden of the Marches
Barons Dacre of Gillesland